Loughborough Inlet is one of the lesser principal inlets of the British Columbia Coast.

Its mouth marks the east end of Chancellor Channel and the west end of Cordero Channel. The mouth of Loughborough Inlet is about midway between the mouths of Bute Inlet, to the east, and Knight Inlet, to the west.

History

James Johnstone, one of George Vancouver's lieutenants during his 1791–95 expedition, first charted the inlet in 1792. Loughborough Inlet was the site of a large cannery town at Roy, which remains on the map as a locality.

See also
List of canneries in British Columbia

References

Fjords of British Columbia
Central Coast of British Columbia
Inlets of British Columbia